Exposed is the sixth studio album from Japanese electronica/rock duo Boom Boom Satellites, released on November 21, 2007.  "Shut Up and Explode" was the opening theme to the anime . It was sold as both a regular CD version and a limited edition containing a DVD with the music video for "Easy Action" and a short documentary documenting the band's 10 years of existence.

Track listing

References

External links
 Boom Boom Satellites official website
 HMV
 Xam'd:  Lost Memories official website
 

2007 albums
Boom Boom Satellites albums